BCA Tower is a skyscraper at Jalan M.H. Thamrin, Central Jakarta, Indonesia.

Facilities
The building is connected to Grand Indonesia Shopping Town, Hotel Indonesia, Kempinski Residences, Jakarta and entertainment center.

A swimming pool and modern fitness outlet are located on the 11th floor.

A restaurant, named Skye on the top floor overlooks the city, which is popular place to view sunset and night skyline of Jakarta.

See also

 List of tallest buildings in Jakarta
 List of tallest buildings in Indonesia

References

Buildings and structures in Jakarta
Office buildings completed in 2008
Post-independence architecture of Indonesia
Skyscraper office buildings in Indonesia